The Red and Black Column was the fifth militia column organized by the CNT-FAI in Barcelona to send to the Aragon front. Its incorporation took place in mid-September, in the Province of Huesca as a reinforcement to the anarchist Ascaso and Harriers columns.

According to Alberto Bayo, the contingent formed with "militiamen from the Unified Socialist Party of Catalonia, a century of foreigners, young people from Estat Català, from the National Confederation of Labor, from the Republican Left of Catalonia, Acció Catalana and the Iberian Anarchist Federation".

References

Bibliography 

 Torralba Coronas, Pedro.  From Ayerbe to Red and Black. 127 Mixed Brigade . Barcelona, 1980.
 Rodrigo, Antonina. "María Lejárraga: a woman in the shade". Barcelona, 2005
 Josep Massot i Muntaner.  'Of war and exile: Mallorca, Montserrat, France, Mexico, 1936-1975' . Barcelona, 2000
 Pedreira, Josep.  Catalan soldiers in the Red and Black (1936-1939) . Barcelona, 2003

Defunct anarchist militant groups
Military units and formations of the Spanish Civil War
Confederal militias
Military units and formations established in 1936
Military units and formations disestablished in 1937